The 2010 Korean Baduk League began on 6 May 2010 and concluded on 23 January 2011. Shinan Chunil Salt defeated Hangame in the final, winning their first league title.

Teams

Chungbuk and Konkuk Milk
Heo Young-ho
Yun Junsang
Han Wonggyu
Cho Hunhyun
Kim Jinwoo
Kim Junghyun

Hangame
Kang Dongyun
Lee Younggu
An Hyungjun
Kim Juho
Yoo Jaeho
Jin Siyoung

Hite Jinro
Choi Cheol-han
Won Seong-jin
Kim Hyeongwoo
An Sungjoon
Han Jongjin
Lee Wonyoung

Kixx
Park Junghwan
Hong Sungji
Lee Wondo
Ko Geuntae
Lee Jaewong
Lee Taehyun

Netmarble
Lee Chang-ho
Kim Seongjae
Song Tae Kon
Seo Gunwoo
Choi Kihoon
Park Jieun

Posco Chemtech
Pak Yeong-hun
Paek Hongsuk
Lee Heesung
Yun Chanhee
Kang Changbae
On Sojin

Shinan Chunil Salt
Lee Sedol
Han Sanghoon
Lee Chungyu
Lee Hobum
Park Siyeol
An Kukhyun

Tbroad
Mok Jin-seok
An Choyoung
Hong Minpyo
Park Seunghwa
Choi Myung-Hoon
Kim Kiyoung

Yeongnam Ilbo
Kim Jiseok
Park Jungsang
Kang Yootaek
Yoo Changhyuk
Baek Daehyun
Park Seunghyun

Final standings

Play-offs

References

2010 in go
Go competitions in South Korea
2010 in South Korean sport
2011 in South Korean sport